David Reginald Browning (born 26 May 1933) is a former Australian rules footballer who played with Carlton in the Victorian Football League (VFL).

Notes

External links 

Dave Browning's profile at Blueseum

1933 births
Carlton Football Club players
Living people
Perth Football Club players
Australian rules footballers from Western Australia